John Kuriyan is the Dean of Basic Sciences and a Professor of Biochemistry at Vanderbilt University School of Medicine. He was formerly the Chancellor's Professor at the University of California, Berkeley in the departments of Molecular and Cell Biology (MCB) and Chemistry, a Faculty Scientist in Berkeley Lab's Physical Biosciences Division, and a Howard Hughes Medical Institute investigator. He is a member of the National Academy of Sciences and he has also been on the Life Sciences jury for the Infosys Prize in 2009, 2019 and 2020.

Education
Kuriyan received his B.S. in chemistry from Juniata College in Pennsylvania, followed by his PhD in physical chemistry at the Massachusetts Institute of Technology supervised by Gregory Petsko and Martin Karplus.

Research and career

Kuriyan did postdoctoral research work for one year supervised by Karplus at Harvard before becoming an assistant professor at the Rockefeller University.  Kuriyan's laboratory studies the structure and mechanism of enzymes and other proteins that transduce cellular signals and perform DNA replication. The laboratory primarily uses x-ray crystallography to determine 3-D protein structures as well as biochemical, biophysical, and computational techniques to uncover the mechanisms used by these proteins.

Awards and honors

He has also received the Cornelius Rhoads Memorial Award from the American Association for Cancer Research (1999), the Eli Lilly Award in Biological Chemistry of the American Chemical Society (1998), the Dupont-Merck Award of the Protein Society (1997), and the Schering-Plough Award of the American Society for Biochemistry and Molecular Biology (1994). In 2009 he received the ASBMB Merck award for his contributions to structural biology. Kuriyan was elected a Foreign Member of the Royal Society (ForMemRS) in 2015.
He was elected to the National Academy of Medicine in 2018.

Books 

 The molecules of life: physical and chemical principles with Konforti, Boyana; Wemmer, David (2013)
 Mechanisms of RAS activation at the membrane (2006)

Publications

 Crystallographic R factor refinement by molecular dynamics
 Structural mechanism for STI-571 inhibition of abelson tyrosine kinase
 Multiple BCR-ABL kinase domain mutations confer polyclonal resistance to the tyrosine kinase inhibitor imatinib (STI571) in chronic phase and blast crisis chronic myeloid leukemia
 The conformational plasticity of protein kinases
 An allosteric mechanism for activation of the kinase domain of epidermal growth factor receptor

References

Year of birth missing (living people)
Living people
American molecular biologists
UC Berkeley College of Chemistry faculty
Harvard University people
Howard Hughes Medical Investigators
Members of the United States National Academy of Sciences
American crystallographers
American biochemists
Foreign Members of the Royal Society
Richard-Lounsbery Award laureates
Members of the National Academy of Medicine